is a Japanese artist who was born in Hiroshima. She graduated from Musashino Art University in 1985. She presented her works at the 47th Venice Biennale (1997) in Italy. She also collaborated with architect Ryue Nishizawa (co-founder of SANAA)  at the Teshima Art Museum on the island of Teshima, in the Seto Inland Sea.

Naito's art is also showcased in The museum of für Moderne Kunst Frankfurt am Main, the Museum of Modern art in New York, the Israel Museum, and the national Museum of Art, Osaka.

References

External links 
 Teshima Art Museum

Living people
1961 births
Japanese contemporary artists